Jerry-Ralph Jules (born June 13, 1981 in Laval, Quebec) is a Canadian football defensive back who is currently a free agent. He most recently played for the Winnipeg Blue Bombers of the Canadian Football League. He was signed as undrafted free agent by the Winnipeg Blue Bombers on March 30, 2011. He played CIS Football with the Montreal Carabins.

References

1981 births
Canadian football defensive backs
Living people
Montreal Carabins football players
Players of Canadian football from Quebec
Sportspeople from Laval, Quebec
Winnipeg Blue Bombers players